The Reconstructionist Rabbinical Association (RRA) founded in 1974, is the professional association of rabbis affiliated with Reconstructionist Judaism. It has approximately 300 members, most of whom are graduates of the Reconstructionist Rabbinical College in Wyncote, Pennsylvania, near Philadelphia. The RRA is a member of a number of national coalitions including the Conference of Presidents of Major American Jewish Organizations.

From 1987 to 1989, Rabbi Joy Levitt was the first female president of the RRA.

In 2007, Rabbi Toba Spitzer became the first openly lesbian or gay person chosen to head a rabbinical association in the United States when she was elected president of the RRA.

Past presidents
 Rabbi David Brusin (RRC '74) (1974-1976)
 Rabbi Arnold Rachlis (RRC '75) (1976-1978)
 Rabbi Dennis C. Sasso (RRC '74) (1978-1980)
 Rabbi Elliot Skiddell (RRC '80) (1980-1983)
 Rabbi Steven Sager (RRC '78) (1983-1985)
 Rabbi Ira Schiffer (RRC '81) (1985-1987)
 Rabbi Joy Levitt (RRC '81) (1987-1989)
 Rabbi Sandy Sasso (RRC '74) (1989-1991)
 Rabbi Lee Friedlander (RRC '75) (1991-1993)
 Rabbi Ron Aigen (RRC '76) (1993-1995)
 Rabbi Michael Cohen (RRC '90) (1995-1996)
 Rabbi Barbara Penzner (RRC '87) (1996-1999)
 Rabbi Dan Ehrenkrantz (RRC '89) )1999-2001)
 Rabbi Nancy Fuchs Kreimer (RRC '82) (2001-2003)
 Rabbi Amy Small (RRC '87) (2003-2005)
 Rabbi Brant Rosen (RRC '92) (2005-2007)
 Rabbi Toba Spitzer (RRC '97) (2007-2009)
 Rabbi Yael Ridberg (RRC '97) (2009-2011)
 Rabbi Fredi Cooper (RRC '00) (2011-2013)
 Rabbi Jason G. Klein (RRC '02) (2013-2015)
 Rabbi Nina H. Mandel (RRC '03) (2015-2017)
 Rabbi Elliott Tepperman (RRC '02) (2020)

See also
 Reconstructionist Rabbinical College
 Reconstructionist Judaism

References

External links 
 Official web site 
 Full text Reconstructionist Rabbinical Association publications available online (Berman Jewish Policy Archive @ NYU Wagner)
 Reconstructionist Rabbinical College
 Reconstructionist Judaism site

Rabbinical organizations
Reconstructionist Judaism in the United States